Nesle-Hodeng is a commune in the Seine-Maritime department in the Normandy region in north-western France.

Geography

Population

Places of interest
 The church of St. Pierre, dating from the twelfth century.
 Parts of the 12th-century abbey at Bival, surviving as farm buildings.
 A sixteenth-century stone cross.
 St-Denis’ church at Hodeng.

See also
Communes of the Seine-Maritime department

References

Communes of Seine-Maritime